The 2018 Michigan State Spartans men's soccer team represented Michigan State University during the 2018 NCAA Division I men's soccer season. The program was coached by 10th year head coach, Damon Rensing. It was the 63rd season the university fielded a men's varsity soccer team, and their 28th season in the Big Ten Conference.

The season was highlighted by Michigan State reaching the College Cup (final four) of the NCAA Division I Men's Soccer Tournament, a feat they had not accomplished since 1968. There, making their first appearance in half a century, they lost to eventual national-runners up, Akron, 5–1.

Three players from this team were drafted in the 2019 MLS SuperDraft: DeJuan Jones, Ryan Sierakowski, and Jimmy Hague.

Background

Roster 
The following players were part of the 2018 Michigan State men's soccer team.

Player movement

Schedule 

|-
!colspan=9 style=""| Preseason
|-

|-
!colspan=9 style=""| Non-conference regular season
|-

|-
!colspan=9 style=""| Big Ten regular season
|-

|-
!colspan=9 style=""| Big Ten Tournament
|-

|-
!colspan=9 style=""| NCAA Tournament
|-

|-

Statistics

Honors

Players selected in the 2019 MLS Draft

See also 
 2018 Big Ten Conference Men's Soccer Tournament
 2018 NCAA Division I Men's Soccer Tournament

References 

Michigan State Spartans men's soccer seasons
Michigan State Spartans
Michigan State Spartans
Michigan State Spartans, soccer men
Michigan State
NCAA Division I Men's Soccer Tournament College Cup seasons